Saint George is one of Dominica's 10 administrative parishes. It is bordered by Saint Paul and part of the Boeri River (to the north), Saint David and Saint Patrick (to the east), Saint Luke (to the south).

The parish has an area of 56.1 km² (21.67 mi²), and has a population of 20,211.

Roseau
The capital city of Dominica, Roseau, is in this parish, as well as its suburbs:
Bath Estate
Elmshall
Kings Hill
Copthall
Newtown (once Charlotteville)
Castle Comfort
Goodwill
Potters Ville
Stock Farm
Tarish Pit
Yam Piece
Belle Vue Rawle
Fond Colé

Other settlements
(all villages)
Bellevue Chopin
Eggleston
Fond Cani
Giraudel
Laudat
Loubiere
Louisville
Morne Prosper
Trafalgar
Wotten Waven

References

 
Parishes of Dominica